Cyrus Baldwin may refer to:

Cyrus Baldwin (engineer) (1773–1854), American civil engineer
Cyrus G. Baldwin (1852–1931), president of Pomona College and hydroelectric power entrepreneur